Chernyshov is a Russian masculine surname, its feminine counterpart is Chernyshova. Notable people with the surname include:
Alexey Chernyshov (born 1963), Russian politician
Andrey Chernyshov (born 1968), Russian association football manager and former player
Galina Chernyshova (born 1993), Russian cyclist
Igor Chernyshov (born 1984), Russian football player
Konstantin Chernyshov (born 1967), Russian chess grandmaster
Oleg Chernyshov (born 1986), Russian football player
Pavel Chernyshov (born 1995), Belarusian football player
Polina Chernyshova (born 1993), Russian theater and film actress
Sergei Chernyshov (disambiguation)
Venera Chernyshova (born 1954), Soviet biathlete
Vladislav Chernyshov (born 1981), Kazakh-Kyrgyz football player
Yegor Chernyshov (footballer, born 1997), Russian football player
Yelizaveta Chernyshova (born 1958), Soviet hurdler
Yevgeni Chernyshov (disambiguation)

See also
Chernyshyov, a similar surname

Russian-language surnames